Monumento de la Dama Desnuda is a statue of a nude woman, installed in Puerto Vallarta, in the Mexican state of Jalisco.

References

External links

 

Outdoor sculptures in Puerto Vallarta
Sculptures of women in Mexico
Statues in Jalisco
Nude sculptures